Steubenville Township is one of the fourteen townships of Jefferson County, Ohio, United States.  The 2010 census found 4,319 people in the township, 865 of whom lived in the unincorporated portions of the township.

Geography
Located in the eastern part of the county along the Ohio River, it borders the following townships and city:
Steubenville - north
Wells Township - south
Cross Creek Township - west

Brooke County, West Virginia lies across the Ohio River to the east.

Most of the northern part of the township is occupied by the city of Steubenville, the county seat of Jefferson County.  Of the remainder, the village of Mingo Junction is located in the northeastern part of the township.

Name and history
Steubenville Township was founded in 1803.

It is the only Steubenville Township statewide.

Government
The township is governed by a three-member board of trustees, who are elected in November of odd-numbered years to a four-year term beginning on the following January 1. Two are elected in the year after the presidential election and one is elected in the year before it. There is also an elected township fiscal officer, who serves a four-year term beginning on April 1 of the year after the election, which is held in November of the year before the presidential election. Vacancies in the fiscal officership or on the board of trustees are filled by the remaining trustees.

References

External links
County website

Townships in Jefferson County, Ohio
Townships in Ohio